St Sampson is a parish of Guernsey, an island in the Bailiwick of Guernsey, directly north of St Peter Port. It is on the north-west and north-east coasts of the island and is split into two sections, intersected by Vale.

The parish has a population of 8,966.

What is currently the northern boundary of the parish originally ran along the south coast of Le Braye du Valle, a tidal channel that made the northern extremity of Guernsey, Le Clos du Valle, a tidal island. La Braye du Valle was drained and reclaimed in 1806 by the British Government as a defence measure. The eastern end of the former channel became the town and harbour (from 1820) of St. Sampson's, now the second biggest port in Guernsey. The western end of La Braye is now Le Grand Havre. The roadway called The Bridge across the end of the harbour at St. Sampson's recalls the bridge that formerly linked the two parts of Guernsey at high tide.

Historical facts

The parish church of St. Sampson claims to be the oldest of Guernsey's parish churches, standing on the coast where Samson of Dol arrived from Brittany in the sixth century, intending to convert Islanders to Christianity. The church was consecrated on 22 May 1111 by the Bishop of Coutances.

St Sampson is the Patron Saint of Guernsey.

In 1814 there were 125 dwellings, housing 788 residents of Saint Sampson. The parish providing 1/13th of all taxes collected in Guernsey.

Harbour facilities improved as trade using the harbour increased. In 1822, 7,000 tons of granite cobbles were exported in 90 ships. By 1836 annual exports had increased to 57,584 tons. In 1841 the south quay was completed and by 1851, 542 ships were using the harbour each year. By 1861 granite exports had risen to 142,866 tons on 737 ships. Today the harbour is used for non-containerised freight, including liquid and gas fuel.

Shipbuilding took place in Saint Sampson, from local trading craft to a tea clipper called Golden Spur and a steamship, the Commerce built in 1874. The Lydia, a local 173 ton brig, sailed in March 1853 from Saint Sampson to Adelaide with 60 emigrants, it took 132 days.

Trams used to run from Saint Sampson to Saint Peter Port from 1879, taking over from a horse-drawn bus that had started operation in 1837. Originally the trams were steam powered, changing to electric in 1891 and continuing in service until 1934.

Features

The features of the parish include:
 Churches:
 St Sampson's Parish Church 
 The Rock Community Church 
 Our Lady Star of the Sea 
 Delancey Elim Church 
 Les Capelles Methodist Church 
 Kingdom Hall of Jehovah's Witnesses 
 Saint Sampson Harbour (southern half) 
 Delancey Park 
 Longue Hougue quarry, in use until 1969 and now a water reservoir
 Military:
 Parish war memorial inside the parish church
 Chateau des Marais, a Motte-and-bailey castle
 Guernsey loophole towers- Mont Crevelt Tower
 German fortifications, built during the occupation 1940-45
 Archaeology:
 A ruined megalith at Delancey park 
 A cist in circles at Sandy Hook, L'Islet 
 Bays
 Grande Havre
 Port Grat
 Pulias
 Pecqueries
 A number of protected buildings 

The parish of St. Sampson hosts:
 The St. Sampson Douzaine
 The island prison
 The Track
 The island's skate park
 The Guernsey studio of Channel Television and BBC Guernsey
 Numerous industrial premises and a fuel farm
 Corbet Field – home of Vale Recreation F.C.
 Hautes Capelles Primary School
 St Mary & St Michael Catholic Primary School
 St. Sampson High School
 Le Murier special needs secondary school
 Oatlands Craft Centre
 White Rock Brewery

Politics
Prior to the States decision to introduce Island Wide Voting St Sampson comprised the whole of the St Sampson administrative division

In the 2016 Guernsey general election there was a 3,509 or 78% turnout to elect six Deputies. Those elected (in order of votes received) being Lyndon Trott, Paul Le Pelley, Jennifer Merrett, Gavin St Pier, Jane Stephens and Carl Meerveld.

References

External links

Sampson
Ports and harbours of Guernsey